Jocara cacalis is a species of snout moth in the genus Jocara It was described by Cajetan Felder, Rudolf Felder and Alois Friedrich Rogenhofer in 1875. It is found in French Guiana.

References

Moths described in 1875
Jocara
Taxa named by Alois Friedrich Rogenhofer